Alfred R. Kilgore (December 19, 1927 - August 15, 1983), who signed his work Al Kilgore, was an American artist who worked as a cartoonist and filmmaker.

Born in Newark, New Jersey, Kilgore attended Andrew Jackson High School where he played basketball with a young Bob Cousy. He also met Dolores Preusch at this time, and the couple married in 1958. During World War II, he served in the Fifth Air Force. After the war, he entered into art studies, graduating from the Art Career School in 1951.

Comic strips and comic books
He was an artist on the Bullwinkle comic strip for the Bell-McClure Syndicate between 1962 and 1967. In 1969, he did a syndicated puzzle feature, TV Star Screen.

Films
He appeared as an actor in Louis McMahon's serial parody Captain Celluloid vs. the Film Pirates, along with fellow film historians and authors Alan G. Barbour and William K. Everson. This four-part, semi-professional production paid homage to Republic Pictures and its adventure serials, while kidding the vintage film subculture of the 1960s. The plot involved a masked villain named The Master Duper, one of three members of a Film Commission who attempts to steal the only known prints of priceless antique films, and the heroic Captain Celluloid, who wears a costume reminiscent of that of the Black Commando in the Columbia serial The Secret Code and is determined to uncover him.

Kilgore produced and scripted The World of Hans Christian Andersen (1971) which he co-directed with Chuck McCann.

He was a founding member of the Laurel and Hardy appreciation society, The Sons of the Desert, and drew the organization's crest. His caricatures of Laurel and Hardy were used in John McCabe's biography, Mr. Laurel and Mr. Hardy (1962).

Kilgore and his wife Dolores lived in Long Island's Queens Village. He died in New York in 1983 from an embolism.

Awards
He was awarded the National Cartoonists Society Silver T-Square in 1976 for outstanding dedication or service to the Society or the profession and its Special Features Award in 1983 for his Elvis the Paper Doll Book.

References

External links
 NCS Awards
 Al Kilgore: King of Cartoons

1927 births
1983 deaths
American comics artists
United States Army personnel of World War II
Artists from Newark, New Jersey
United States Army Air Forces soldiers
Deaths from embolism